Zalyazhye is a rural locality (a village) in Kargopolsky District, Arkhangelsk Oblast, Russia. The population was 3 as of 2012.

Geography 
Zalyazhye is located 7 km north of Kargopol (the district's administrative centre) by road. Kiprovo is the nearest rural locality.

References 

Rural localities in Kargopolsky District